Transforming growth factor beta-3 is a protein that in humans is encoded by the  gene.

It is a type of protein, known as a cytokine, which is involved in cell differentiation, embryogenesis and development. It belongs to a large family of cytokines called the Transforming growth factor beta superfamily, which includes the TGF-β family, Bone morphogenetic proteins (BMPs), growth and differentiation factors (GDFs), inhibins and activins.

TGF-β3 is believed to regulate molecules involved in cellular adhesion and extracellular matrix (ECM) formation during the process of palate development.  Without TGF-β3, mammals develop a deformity known as a cleft palate. This is caused by failure of epithelial cells in both sides of the developing palate to fuse.  TGF-β3 also plays an essential role in controlling the development of lungs in mammals, by also regulating cell adhesion and ECM formation in this tissue, and controls wound healing by regulating the movements of epidermal and dermal cells in injured skin.

Interactions 

Transforming growth factor, beta 3 has been shown to interact with TGF beta receptor 2.

Clinical research

After successful phase I/II trials, human recombinant TGF-β3 (Avotermin, planned trade name Juvista) failed in Phase III trials.

References

Further reading

External links 
  GeneReviews/NCBI/NIH/UW entry on Arrhythmogenic Right Ventricular Dysplasia/Cardiomyopathy, Autosomal Dominant
  OMIM entries on Arrhythmogenic Right Ventricular Dysplasia/Cardiomyopathy, Autosomal Dominant
 

Proteins
TGFβ domain